Cornetu may refer to the following places in Romania:

Cornetu, a commune in Ilfov County
 Cornetu, a village in Șimnicu de Sus Commune, Dolj County
 Cornetu, a village in Căpreni Commune, Gorj County
 Cornetu, a village in Vaideeni Commune, Vâlcea County
 Cornetu, a village in Slobozia Bradului Commune, Vrancea County
 Cornetu River

See also 
 Cornel (disambiguation)
 Cornelia (disambiguation)
 Cornu (disambiguation)
 Corni (disambiguation)
 Cornea (disambiguation)
 Cornățel (disambiguation)
 Cornești (disambiguation)
 Corneanu (disambiguation)